Chandlerian is an eponymous adjective and may refer to:

Alfred D. Chandler, Jr. (1918–2007), professor of business history who wrote extensively about the scale and management structures of modern corporations
Raymond Chandler (1888–1959), American novelist and screenwriter, known for hard-boiled detective fiction